Bipin Chandran is an Indian writer and screenwriter from Kerala. He predominantly works in Malayalam cinema and his debut film was Daddy Cool.

Biography
Bipin Chandran was born in Ponkunnam, Kerala, India. He Joined St. Berchmans College, Changanacherry and met Martin PS, today's Martin Prakkat, Kerala State Film Award winner for Best Director. Bipin attended Maharaja's college, Ernakulam for Post Graduation.

Chandran is an author. he wrote the book Mammootty: Kazhchayum Vayanayum, an anthology of memoirs that mark Mammootty as an actor, interviews and essays. His other works are Kriyaathmaka Jeevithathilekku Pathu Chuvadukal (translation of Windy Dryden's 10 steps to creative living), Best Actor Screenplay and Maayude Kathukal (translation of letters written to Ajitha by Mandakini Narayanan). Bipin Chandran has come out with his new book titled Ormayundo ee mukham, a book discussing the cult dialogues of Malayalam movies recently. Irattachanku is another of his books.

Chandran, who regularly writes articles on films, received the 2019 Kerala State Film Award for Best Article on Cinema, for two of his articles, Komali Melkkai Nedunna Kaalam and Madambilliyile Manorogi.

Filmography

References

Further reading

External links
 
 
 

People from Kottayam district
Screenwriters from Kerala
Malayalam screenwriters
Year of birth missing (living people)
Kerala State Film Award winners
Malayali people
Year of birth missing
Malayalam-language writers
Maharaja's College, Ernakulam alumni
21st-century Indian male writers